Malina Debnath is an Indian politician who is serving as Member of Tripura Legislative Assembly from Jubarajnagar Assembly constituency. She won with the margin of 4,572 votes. She took oath as MLA on June 28, 2022.

Personal life 
She has done Master of Arts from Tripura University in 2001.

References 

Tripura MLAs 2018–2023
Tripura University alumni
21st-century Indian women politicians
Year of birth missing (living people)
Living people
Bharatiya Janata Party politicians from Tripura